Thryptomene pinifolia is a species of flowering plant in the family Myrtaceae and is endemic to Kalbarri National Park in Western Australia. It is a shrub with linear leaves, and flowers with pale pinkish sepals and petals and seven or eight stamens.

Description
They are prominently glandular and curve upwards. Flowering occurs from October to November.

Taxonomy
Thryptomene pinifolia was first formally described in 2014 by Barbara Lynette Rye and Malcolm Eric Trudgen in the journal Nuytsia from specimens collected near Eurardy in 2000. The specific epithet (pinifolia) means "pine-leaved".

Distribution and habitat
This thryptomene grows in sand on sandplain in Kalbarri National Park in the Geraldton Sandplains biogeographic region of Western Australia.

Conservation status
Thryptomene pinifolia is classified as "Priority Two" by the Western Australian Government Department of Parks and Wildlife meaning that it is poorly known and from only one or a few locations.

References

pinifolia
Endemic flora of Western Australia
Rosids of Western Australia
Vulnerable flora of Australia
Plants described in 2014
Taxa named by Barbara Lynette Rye
Taxa named by Malcolm Eric Trudgen